Daydream is the fifth studio album by American singer-songwriter Mariah Carey, released on September 26, 1995, by Columbia Records. The follow-up to her internationally successful studio album Music Box (1993), and the holiday album Merry Christmas (1994), Daydream differed from her previous releases by leaning increasingly toward hip hop and urban music. Throughout the project, Carey collaborated with Walter Afanasieff, with whom she wrote and produced most of her previous albums. With Daydream, Carey took more control over the musical direction as well as the album's composition. Carey considered the album to be the beginning of her musical and vocal transition, a change that would become more evident in her sixth studio album Butterfly (1997). During the album's production, Carey endured many creative differences with her label and then-husband Tommy Mottola. On Daydream, Carey collaborated with Jermaine Dupri, Kenneth "Babyface" Edmonds, and R&B group Boyz II Men. With Afanasieff's assistance and the addition of a few contemporary producers, she was able to make a subtle transition into the contemporary R&B market, after previously only pursuing pop, adult contemporary and traditional R&B music.

Daydream received critical acclaim, with reviewers praising the album's production, its sonic quality, and Carey's musical progression. It became Carey's best reviewed album up to that point and garnered six nominations at the 38th Grammy Awards, including for Album of the Year. It was later included on the List of 200 Definitive Albums in the Rock and Roll Hall of Fame. Daydream became a global success, topping the charts in nine countries, and reaching the top five in almost every major music market. It was Carey's second album to be certified Diamond by the RIAA. As of 2019, Daydream has sold over 20 million copies worldwide and is one of the best-selling albums of all time.

Six singles were released from the album. Its lead single "Fantasy" became the first single by a female artist to debut at number one on the US Billboard Hot 100 and went on to top the chart for eight weeks, and became the second best-selling single of 1995 in the country. The second single "One Sweet Day" topped the Billboard Hot 100 for sixteen weeks and became the longest-running number-one single in Billboards history, holding the record for 23 years. The album's next single "Always Be My Baby" reached number one as well. Jointly, the singles from Daydream spent a combined six months at the top of the Hot 100. To promote the album, Carey embarked on the short but successful, Daydream World Tour, visiting Japan and Europe.

Background and release 
Aside from being Carey's second best-selling record worldwide, Daydream served as her most personal and directly influenced album at the time. During the album's recording, Carey grew as an artist, as well as a writer. For the first time in her career, Carey was able to make music that she truly related to, R&B and hip hop. While Columbia allowed Carey more leniency with the music she recorded, they became hesitant when she featured Ol' Dirty Bastard in the remix for "Fantasy". They feared the sudden change was completely left field for her music, and worried it would jeopardize the album's success. In an interview with Entertainment Weekly, Carey openly spoke of her issues with Columbia: "Everybody was like 'What, are you crazy?' They're nervous about breaking the formula. It works to have me sing a ballad on stage in a long dress with my hair up."

While Carey's new musical direction caused tension between her and Columbia, it began to severely strain her relationship with her husband at the time, Tommy Mottola. Mottola had always been involved in Carey's career, because he was the head of Sony Music, the parent company of her label. Since the time of Carey's debut, Mottola had controlled nearly every aspect of her career, keeping her sound carefully regulated and insisting that she continue recording middle-of-the-road pop music, despite her interest in hip hop.

Carey confessed that she never tried to change the situation because "[she] used to be insecure and cautious, and so [she] would listen to what the people said." However, the control Mottola exerted over her career soon "spilled into her personal life" once they were married, increasing the amount of conflict between the two. Soon, it was obvious that their marriage was in shambles; as stated in a Vanity Fair article, "the couple began to argue at the drop of a hat." Carey was very involved in the project, more so than she had ever been on an album. "I went into this phase of recording, recording, recording and doing it really fast," she told Time. "This time, I had more time, and I focused more on what I wanted to do." As Carey's career and work continued to reflect her views on how it should sound, her marriage to Mottola continued to "deteriorate".

During the recording of Daydream, Carey also worked on the alternative rock album Someone's Ugly Daughter by the band Chick, contributing writing, production, vocals and art direction. As Columbia refused to release the album with her lead vocals, Carey's friend Clarissa Dane was brought in to become the face of Chick, and her vocals were layered on top of Carey's, masking her voice. According to Carey, "I was playing with the style of the breezy-grunge, punk-light white female singers who were popular at the time ... I totally looked forward to doing my alter-ego band sessions after Daydream each night." Her contributions were secret until the release of her 2020 memoir The Meaning of Mariah Carey.

Daydream was released in Taiwan on September 26, 1995, Europe on September 28, Japan on September 30, Hong Kong on October 2, and the United States on October 3.

Conception and composition 

One of the first songs that was recorded for the album was "Fantasy". While Carey began developing new ideas for Daydream, she heard the song "Genius of Love" by Tom Tom Club on the radio. She had always been a fan of the song, and presented Dave Hall with the idea of sampling the song's hook. Hall incorporated a groove that he felt complimented Carey's voice, while she composed some of the other beats and wrote the lyrics. Carey recorded a remix to the song as well, featuring hip-hop verses from O.D.B of the Wu-Tang Clan, as well as production from Puffy. She spoke highly of the remix, complimenting Puffy and O.D.B, "He's so known in the street, and he's one of the best people out there...we kind of did what we both do and having O.D.B took it to another level. He was my ultimate choice, so I was really happy with the way it turned out." "One Sweet Day" was a song that Carey wrote with the R&B group Boyz II Men. After Carey's friend and past collaborator David Cole died, she began writing and developing a song that would pay homage to him and all the friends and family her fans had lost along life's journey. Carey had the chorus and concept composed, and after meeting with Boyz II Men, they realized they too had a similar idea in development. Together, using Carey's chorus and idea, as well as the melody they had produced, they wrote and composed the song. It was produced by Afanasieff, who built on the song's melody and added various grooves and beats.

While the album's development was underway, Carey expressed interest in working with Jermaine Dupri, whom she had been a fan of since his 1992 song, "Jump". Soon after, Carey, Dupri, and Manuel Seal began composing a song for the album, with Carey and Dupri becoming close friends and frequent collaborators on later albums. As Seal played the piano, Carey began humming and playing with certain notes in the B-section, until she came up with the chorus for "Always Be My Baby". After the rest of the song was written and composed, Carey recorded the song alongside longtime background singers Kelly Price, Shanrae Price, and Melonie Daniels. Together, they built "a wall of background voices" in which she would cover with her final belting notes. The song featured a downbeat rhythm, while its composition was described as "sassy and soft R&B" which displayed a "sexy and slow jam".
"Underneath the Stars" was the first song recorded for Daydream. The song featured a "'70s soul vibe" as well as synthetic record scratches, in order to the give the song an authentic '70s sound. Carey felt the additions were simple steps taken to further display a contemporary R&B groove. Additionally, she felt the song paid homage to the style of Minnie Riperton, who was one of Carey's biggest vocal influences growing up. The song had a soft sound, and had " of texture" and bass, showing a more creative side to Carey.

For the album, Carey covered the 1982 Journey song "Open Arms". The song was of Carey's personal choice, as well as her own idea. Together with Afanasieff, they toned down the song's arrangement, making it a bit glossy, especially in comparison to the "raw and powerful 'One Sweet Day.'" Additionally, with the help of her background singers, Carey added a touch of gospel to the song. One of the more gospel-influenced songs on the album was "I Am Free". The song was created by Carey, Afanasieff and Loris Holland, with whom she had worked previously on Merry Christmas. Carey began humming the melody with the lyrics she had already written, while Holland played the organ and Afanasieff worked on the song's programming., giving the song a genuine and unforced gospel feel. The chorus was sophisticated and natural, with each following line "cascading onto one another", something that would have proved difficult for a "less skilled vocalist". Carey started leaning away from the "standard Celine Dion ballad" and more towards R&B jams. However, she was not going to completely abandon the type of songs that made her famous. For this reason, Carey wrote "When I Saw You" with Afanasieff, a song that would truly embody some of her earlier work, as well as show off her powerful vocals. Returning to her R&B territory, Carey recorded "Long Ago", the second song she wrote alongside Dupri and Seal which contains a strong hip hop background. Her vocals in the song were described as "sliding over the insistent bassline like silk."

"Melt Away" was a song Carey produced on her own, and co-wrote with Babyface. The song's writing and production were "superb". with each verse gliding into its chorus. According to Chris Nickson, "Melt Away" was as "strong as any slow jam released in the nineties, and one that would find a lot of flavor late at night with dancers." Another song that brought back reminders of older decades was "Forever". The throwback was featured through the chord changes and in the way the guitar arpeggios "stayed at the forefront of the music." The song displayed subtle vocals from Carey, as well as an undeniable richness. "Daydream Interlude (Sweet Fantasy Dub Mix)" was one of the liveliest tracks on the album. The song was a club remix of "Fantasy", which was tuned and remixed by famed house music producer David Morales. The song was directed to be a dance-club song, further broadening Carey's "musical horizon". The song incorporated Carey's vocals, and added them to a thumping house beat, something he would do for many of her future singles. "Looking In" was the final song on the album. Written in 15 minutes, it was Carey's most personal song at the time, one in which she let herself appear "naked" and "stripped down; it was written by her and Afanasieff.

Two additional tracks from the album sessions have been released, with "Slipping Away" (another Dave Hall collaboration) serving as the B-side to "Always Be My Baby," and, 25 years later, "One Night", another collaboration with Jermaine Dupri, being released on The Rarities compilation album (along with "Slipping Away") in 2020.

Promotion 

In order to promote the album, Carey embarked on her second head-lining tour. Originally she was against touring due to the long travel times and hassle, but obliged due to fan request. The tour reached Japan and select European countries, not visiting the United States. This was possibly due to the mixed reception Carey's 1993 North American Music Box Tour received three years prior. The shows were all spaced apart, giving Carey time to rest her vocals, "It's very strenuous to sing all my songs back to back, but I'm actually really looking forward to it." Before embarking on her world tour in 1996, Carey performed a sold-out show at Madison Square Garden in 1995. The performance was filmed, and released as a DVD titled Fantasy: Mariah Carey at Madison Square Garden. It became Carey's fourth video release.

For the show, Carey sang fourteen original songs, including many of her biggest hits up until that point, as well as many songs from Daydream. They included "Fantasy", "One Sweet Day", "Open Arms", "Always Be My Baby", "Forever" and "Underneath the Stars" as well as hits from her previous studio efforts. Carey's following shows in France, Germany, The Netherlands and the United Kingdom were all sold-out as well, receiving warm critical response. During the span of the tour's seven short dates, Carey had already begun working on concepts for her new album Butterfly.

In addition to touring the world, Carey performed on a variety of television programs and award shows. After "Fantasy" was released in September throughout Europe, Carey performed the song on the popular British chart show Top of the Pops, which aired live via satellite on Asian television. Carey performed "Fantasy" in France and at the 23rd Annual American Music Awards on January 29, 1996. "One Sweet Day" was performed at the 38th Annual Grammy Awards, Princess Diana's memorial service in September 1997, and at Carey's Black Entertainment Television Christmas special in 2001. During her European promotional tour for the album, Carey performed "Open Arms" on various television programs, including Wetten, dass..? in Germany, Top of the Pops and Des O'Connor in the United Kingdom and on Swedish television.

Singles 

Six singles were released from Daydream. "Fantasy" was released as the album's lead single on August 23, 1995. The song debuted at number one on the Billboard Hot 100, making Carey the first female artist, and the second performer ever to accomplish the feat. The song spent eight consecutive weeks atop the chart, as well as topping the charts in Australia, Canada and New Zealand. In Europe, "Fantasy" performed well, peaking within the top five in Belgium, Finland, France, and the United Kingdom. "Fantasy" was the second best-selling single of 1995 in the US, with sales of 1.5 million in 95' alone. "One Sweet Day" was chosen as the follow-up single, achieving similar success. The song once again debuted at the top of the US charts, and became the longest running number one single in US history holding that record for 23 years, spending sixteen consecutive weeks atop the Billboard charts. The song became a success in other regions around the world as well, topping the charts in Canada and New Zealand and peaked within the top five in Australia, France, Ireland, and The Netherlands. Serving as the album's third single in select European countries, "Open Arms" was released on December 5, 1995. The song achieved success in the UK, Ireland and New Zealand, where it peaked at number four, seven and eight. However, "Open Arms" charted weakly in other European countries, such as Belgium, France, and Germany, where it charted outside the top-thirty.

"Always Be My Baby" was released as the fourth single. The song debuted at number two on the Hot 100, failing to become Carey's third number one debut (a feat she would accomplish with "Honey" in 1997). The song eventually reached and stayed atop the charts for two weeks, and then kept steady at number two for nine weeks. "Always Be My Baby" performed moderately in other major markets. The song peaked within the top five in Canada, New Zealand and the UK, but charted outside the top-ten elsewhere. "Forever" was chosen as the fifth single from Daydream. The song was ineligible to chart in the Hot 100, but managed to crack the top-ten on the Hot 100 airplay chart. "Forever" charted well in Canada, where it peaked at number thirteen. "Underneath the Stars" was chosen as the sixth and final single from the album. Described by Carey as one of her favorite songs, "Underneath the Stars" received a limited number of pressings in the US, where it charted weakly on the Billboard Hot R&B/Hip-Hop Songs.

Critical reception 

Daydream received acclaim from music critics. Stephen Holden of The New York Times wrote that Carey's songwriting had improved dramatically, "becoming more relaxed, sexier, and less reliant on thudding clichés". "One Sweet Day", "Melt Away", "Always Be My Baby", and "Underneath the Stars" were singled out as highlights, while "Fantasy" featured what Holden described as "some of the most gorgeously spun choral music to be found on a contemporary album". Los Angeles Times journalist Cheo H. Coker said Daydream boasted material that would silence Carey's critics—especially "Fantasy" and "Underneath the Stars"—and offered "something for everybody while somehow remaining true to her essence". People magazine deemed it Carey's best album, benefiting from "funkier and mellower" songs and the singer's improved control over her voice, "evincing greater muscularity and agility". According to Encyclopedia of Popular Music writer Colin Larkin, "some critics questioned whether Daydream was a controlled exercise in vacuous formula writing, with little emotion or heart." Reviewing the album for Entertainment Weekly, Ken Tucker preferred the "less dignified tunes"—particularly "Daydream Interlude (Fantasy Sweet Dub Mix)"—over the "monuments to assiduous good taste" in "When I Saw You" and "I Am Free", which he panned as overwrought ballads. Tucker nonetheless called it Carey's best album since her 1990 self-titled debut.

In a retrospective review for AllMusic, Stephen Thomas Erlewine called Daydream Carey's "best record to date, featuring a consistently strong selection of songs and a remarkably impassioned performance by Carey." In Erlewine's opinion, the album appealed to both urban R&B and adult contemporary audiences while showing that "Carey continues to perfect her craft, and that she has earned her status as an R&B/pop diva." In The Rolling Stone Album Guide (2004), Arion Berger said the album "adheres to the classic radio-friendly diva format, alternating between frisky dance tunes and overscaled ballads". He highlighted the songs contributed by Afanasieff while lamenting Carey's cover of "Open Arms".

Accolades

Commercial performance 
In the United States, Daydream debuted at number one on the Billboard 200 with 224,000 copies sold. The album moved 760,000 copies during the Christmas week of 1995, the largest sales week by a solo female artist until Britney Spears's Oops!... I Did It Again in 2000. Daydream sold at least 90,000 copies a week in the seven months following its release. It was the second best-selling album of 1996, and the eighteenth best-selling album on the 1990s decade in the US. Daydream became Carey's best-selling album in the United States, being certified 11× platinum by the Recording Industry Association of America (RIAA), denoting shipments of over 11 million copies.

In Canada, Daydream peaked at number two on the charts, and was certified seven-times Platinum by the Canadian Recording Industry Association (CRIA). The album experienced success in Europe, where it reached number one in Germany, The Netherlands, Switzerland and the United Kingdom. In France, Daydream peaked at number two and was certified double-Platinum by the Syndicat National de l'Édition Phonographique (SNEP). Daydream was certified triple-Platinum by the International Federation of the Phonographic Industry (IFPI), denoting shipments of three million copies throughout Europe in 1996.

In Australia, Daydream was certified five-times Platinum by the Australian Recording Industry Association (ARIA), denoting shipments of 350,000 copies. The album finished ninth on the ARIA End of Year Charts in both 1995 and 1996. In Japan, the album debuted at number one on the Oricon charts. According to the Oricon, Daydream made the top five of the best-selling albums in Japan by a non-Asian artist, with 2.2 million copies sold. Daydream remains one of the best-selling albums by women in history, with sales of over 20 million copies worldwide (as of 2019).

Accolades 
The music industry took note of Carey's success. She won two awards at the 1996 American Music Awards for her solo efforts: Favorite Pop/Rock Female Artist and Favorite Soul/R&B Female Artist. Throughout 1995 and 1996, Carey was awarded various prestigious awards at the World Music Awards, including World's Best Selling Female R&B Artist, World's Best Selling Overall Female Recording Artist, World's Best Selling Pop Artist and World's Best Selling Overall Recording Artist. Additionally, "Fantasy" was named Song of the Year at the BMI Awards and Favorite Song at the Blockbuster Entertainment Awards, where Carey also won the award for Top Pop Female. In 1996, Carey won many awards at the Billboard Music Awards, including Hot 100 Singles Artist of the Year, Hot 100 Airplay ("Always Be My Baby"), Hot Adult Contemporary Artist of the Year and Special Award for 16 weeks at #1 for "One Sweet Day".

Pitchfork writer, Jamieson Cox, called the album, specifically "Underneath the Stars", a "tribute to '70s R&B legends like Minnie Riperton, complete with vinyl crackle". He went on to praise Carey's use of "flows [...] with the ease of someone with a genuine appreciation for hip-hop". Carey began a "seamless blend of pop and hip-hop" within this album, but eventually went on to be the core of Butterfly, and it served as the foundation for her late-career reinvigoration nearly a decade later. Cox added that Daydream "wasn't just transitional in a musical sense [...] it was the beginning of the end for Mariah's innocence". In July 2017, the album ranked at number 97 on the list for the 150 greatest female albums of all time by the National Public Radio.

Grammy Awards controversy 

Daydream proved to be one of the best-selling and most acclaimed albums of 1995. When the Grammy Award nominees were announced, and Daydream was nominated for six different awards, critics began raving how it would be "cleaning up" that year. The 38th Annual Grammy Awards were held on February 28, 1996, at the Shrine Auditorium in Los Angeles. Carey, being a multiple award nominee, was one of the headlining performers at the ceremony. Together with Boyz II Men, she performed a live rendition of "One Sweet Day", to a very positive response. However, as the award winners were announced one by one, Carey watched as her name was not called up even once. Daydream had lost all of its six nominations, shocking most critics who branded it the "album of the year". With every passing loss, the television cameras continued to zoom on Carey's face, who was finding it more difficult to retain her smile. By the end of the night, Carey had not won a single award. The disappointment on her face was "painfully obvious", according to media outlets. Carey did not perform again until the 2006 ceremony, when she was nominated for eight awards (winning three) for The Emancipation of Mimi.

Track listing 

Notes
  signifies a co-producer

Sample credits
 "Fantasy" and "Daydream Interlude (Fantasy Sweet Dub Mix)" contains a sample and interpolation of Tom Tom Club's "Genius of Love" (1981)
 "Long Ago" contains a sample of Zapp's "More Bounce to the Ounce" (1980)

Personnel 
Adapted from the Daydream liner notes.

 Mariah Carey – vocals, producer, writer, arranger, crowd noise
 Walter Afanasieff – producer, arranger, programming, synthesizer, bass, keyboard instruments, drum programming
 Babyface – keyboards, background vocals
 Michael McCary – writing, vocals
 Nathan Morris – writing, vocals
 Wanya Morris – writing, vocals
 Shawn Stockman – writing, vocals
 Manuel Seal – piano, writing
 Tristan Avakian – guitar
 Melonie Daniels – crowd noise
 Jermaine Dupri – producer, arranger, lead and backup vocals
 Mick Guzauski – mixing
 Dave Hall – producer, arranger, programming
 Jay Healy – engineer, mixing
 Loris Holland – organ, hammond organ
 Dann Huff – guitar
 Kurt Lundvall – engineer
 David Morales – bass, arranger, keyboards, programming, producer
 Kelly Price – crowd noise
 Shanrae Price – crowd noise

Production
 Mike Scott – engineer
 Manuel Seal – producer, lead and backup vocals
 Dan Shea – synthesizer, bass, keyboards, programming, moog synthesizer, drum programming, synthesizer bass
 Andy Smith – engineer
 David Sussman – engineer, mixing
 Phil Tan – engineer
 Steve Thornton – percussion
 Dana Jon Chappelle – engineer
 Terry Burrus – piano
 Satoshi Tomiie – bass, keyboards, programming, synthesizer bass
 Brian Vibberts – engineer
 Gary Cirimelli – programming, digital programming
 Randy Walker – programming
 Acar Key – engineer
 Frank Filipetti – engineer
 Mark Krieg – 2nd engineer
 Kirk Yano – additional tracking engineer
 Mick Guzauski –  mixing

Charts

Weekly charts

Year-end charts

Decade-end charts

All-time charts

Certifications and sales

See also 
 List of best-selling albums
 List of best-selling albums by women
 List of best-selling albums in the United States
 List of best-selling albums in Japan

Notes

References 

 
 

Mariah Carey albums
1995 albums
Columbia Records albums
Albums produced by Walter Afanasieff
Albums produced by Jermaine Dupri